The 2022 Internazionali Femminili di Palermo was a professional women's tennis tournament played on outdoor clay courts at the Country Time Club. It was the 30th edition of the tournament and part of the 2022 WTA Tour. It took place in Palermo, Italy, between 18 and 24 July 2022.

Finals

Singles 

  Irina-Camelia Begu def.  Lucia Bronzetti 6–2, 6–2

This was Begu's first title of the year and fifth of her career.

Doubles 

  Anna Bondár /  Kimberley Zimmermann def.  Amina Anshba /  Panna Udvardy 6–3, 6–2.

Singles main draw entrants

Seeds

† Rankings are as of 11 July 2022

Other entrants
The following players received wildcards into the main draw:
  Elisabetta Cocciaretto 
  Sara Errani
  Lucrezia Stefanini

The following player received entry using a protected ranking:
  Laura Siegemund

The following players received entry from the qualifying draw:
  Elina Avanesyan
  Marina Bassols Ribera
  Léolia Jeanjean
  Rebeka Masarova
  Asia Muhammad
  Matilde Paoletti

The following player received entry as a lucky loser:
  Carolina Alves
  Jaimee Fourlis
  Julia Grabher

Withdrawals 
 Before the tournament
  Kaja Juvan → replaced by  Panna Udvardy
  Danka Kovinić → replaced by  Ylena In-Albon
  Petra Martić → replaced by  Jaimee Fourlis
  Arantxa Rus → replaced by  Ana Bogdan
  Laura Siegemund → replaced by  Julia Grabher
  Ajla Tomljanović → replaced by  Chloé Paquet
  Martina Trevisan → replaced by  Carolina Alves
 During the tournament
  Zhang Shuai

Doubles main draw entrants

Seeds

† Rankings are as of 11 July 2022

Other entrants
The following pairs received wildcards into the doubles main draw:
  Elisabetta Cocciaretto /  Camilla Rosatello
  Lisa Pigato /  Lucrezia Stefanini

The following pair received entry into the doubles main draw using a special ranking:
  Anastasia Dețiuc /  Paula Kania-Choduń

The following pair received entry as alternates:
  Jaimee Fourlis /  Gabriela Lee

Withdrawals
  Natela Dzalamidze /  Kaja Juvan → replaced by  Natela Dzalamidze /  Anastasia Tikhonova
  Ekaterine Gorgodze /  Oksana Kalashnikova → replaced by  Anna Danilina /  Oksana Kalashnikova
  Laura Siegemund /  Zhang Shuai → replaced by  Wang Xiyu /  Zhang Shuai
  Elisabetta Cocciaretto /  Camilla Rosatello → replaced by  Jaimee Fourlis /  Gabriela Lee

References

External links 
 Official website 

Internazionali Femminili di Palermo
Internazionali Femminili di Palermo
2022 in Italian women's sport
Internazionali Femminili di Palermo
2022 in Italian tennis